Pachynoa is a genus of moths of the family Crambidae.

Species
Pachynoa circulalis Sauber in Semper, 1899
Pachynoa fruhstorferi E. Hering, 1903
Pachynoa fuscilalis Hampson, 1891
Pachynoa grossalis (Guenée, 1854)
Pachynoa hypsalis Hampson, 1896
Pachynoa interrupta Whalley, 1962
Pachynoa mineusalis (Walker, 1859)
Pachynoa purpuralis Walker, 1866
Pachynoa spilosomoides (Moore, 1886)
Pachynoa thoosalis (Walker, 1859)
Pachynoa umbrigera Meyrick, 1938
Pachynoa xanthochyta Turner, 1933

References

Spilomelinae
Crambidae genera
Taxa named by Julius Lederer